The McKinley River is a  tributary of the Kantishna River in central Alaska in the United States. It drains an area on the north slope of the Alaska Range on the south edge of the Tanana Valley southwest of Fairbanks.  The river issues from Muldrow Glacier in the northern Alaska Range in Denali National Park and Preserve, northeast of Denali. It flows through the tundra north of the Alaska Range in a generally northwest direction, joining Birch Creek to form the Kantishna River near Chilchukabena Lake.

The river was named McKinley Fork by A.H. Brooks in 1905. Other names or variants include Henteeth No' Tl'o and Hintusno' Dikats.

See also
List of rivers of Alaska

References

Alaska Range
Rivers of Denali Borough, Alaska
Rivers of Alaska
Denali National Park and Preserve
Rivers of Yukon–Koyukuk Census Area, Alaska
Rivers of Unorganized Borough, Alaska